Aghaderrard Court Tomb is a court cairn and National Monument located in County Leitrim, Ireland.

Location

Aghaderrard Court Tomb is located south of Lough Melvin, halfway between Buckode and Kinlough.

History

Aghaderrard Court Tomb was built c. 4000–2500 BC, in the Neolithic.

Description
One longitudinal half of the court cairn survives, with roofstones tipped over the side stones. Behind this is an altar-like stone with six large cup marks. This was formerly known as "The Druid's Altar."

References

National Monuments in County Leitrim
Archaeological sites in County Leitrim